1975 had new titles such as Western Gun, Dungeon and dnd. The year's best-selling arcade game was Taito's Speed Race, released as Wheels and Wheels II in North America.

Financial performance in the United States
The "paddle game" trend came to an end in arcades around 1975, with the arcade video game industry entering a period of stagnation in the "post paddle game era" over the next several years up until 1977.

Best-selling arcade games
The following titles were the best-selling arcade video games of 1975 in the United States, according to annual arcade cabinet sales figures provided by Ralph H. Baer.

Highest-grossing arcade games
In the United States, RePlay magazine published the first annual chart of top-grossing arcade games in March 1976, listing both video games and electro-mechanical games (EM games) on the same chart for the previous year. The following were the highest-grossing arcade games of the previous year, in terms of coin drop earnings.

Events
In Fall, Magnavox discontinues the original Odyssey video game console.
On April 21, Zanussi obtained the license to implement Pong from Sanders Associates.

Business
 New companies: Cinematronics, Enix

Notable releases

Video game consoles 
 September 12 – Epoch releases Japan's first home video game console, the TV Tennis Electrotennis dedicated home video game console. Its most unusual feature is that the console (including the controller) is wireless, functioning through a UHF antenna.
 December – Atari and Tele-Games (a division of Sears, Roebuck and Company) release the first official home version of Pong (called Home Pong) through Sears department stores.
 Magnavox releases two new models of their Odyssey console: the Odyssey 100 and the Odyssey 200.
Philips released the Philips Tele-Game ES 2201 dedicated home video game console, the first system of the Philips Tele-Game series.

Games 
February – Midway releases Taito's 1974 arcade racing video game Speed Race, the first video game in the Speed Race series designed by Tomohiro Nishikado, in North America as Wheels and Racer.
 February – Horror Games, founded by Nolan Bushnell, publishes its only game, Shark Jaws, intended to cash-in on the popularity of Steven Spielberg's film Jaws.

 Taito releases Western Gun, the first video game to depict human-to-human combat. Designed by Tomohiro Nishikado, the game had two distinct joystick controls per player, with one eight-way joystick for moving the computerized cowboy around on the screen and the other for changing the shooting direction.
November – Midway releases Gun Fight, an adaptation of Taito's Western Gun and the first microprocessor-based video game. Taito's Western Gun used TTL-based hardware, which Dave Nutting Associates ported to the Intel 8080 microprocessor for its North American release.

Don Daglow develops Dungeon, an early role-playing video game, for the PDP-10.

William Crowther develops Adventure (also known as Colossal Cave and ADVENT), the first interactive fiction game, for the PDP-10.

 Rusty Rutherford develops pedit5, the first dungeon crawl game, for the PLATO system.

 dnd, the first video game to include a boss, and arguably the first computer role-playing game, wrapped up initial development. Some sources list the game as 1974; it is unclear exactly when it became playable.
 Nürburgring 1, the first first-person racing game, was developed in Germany by Dr. Reiner Foerst.

See also
1975 in games

References

Video games
Video games by year